Immunoconjugates are antibodies conjugated (joined) to a second molecule, usually a toxin, radioisotope or label.

These conjugates are used in immunotherapy and to develop monoclonal antibody therapy as a targeted form of chemotherapy when they are often known as antibody-drug conjugates.

When the conjugates include a radioisotope see radioimmunotherapy.
When the conjugates include a toxin see immunotoxin.

References

Further reading 
Technology Insight: cytotoxic drug immunoconjugates for cancer therapy. 2007 looks useful from the abstract. 
Targeted Therapy of Cancer: New Prospects for Antibodies and Immunoconjugates. 2006 full article, 18 pages. 
Arming antibodies: prospects and challenges for immunoconjugates. 2005 10 pages.

Immunology
Antineoplastic drugs